Today, Mazda's kei cars use Suzuki engines, though the originals from the 1960s used a Mazda-designed OHV engine family.

F5B
 .55 L F5B - Suzuki F5B engine, used in the (Suzuki-built) 1989 Mazda Carol

F6A
 .66 L F6A - Suzuki F6A engine, used in the (Suzuki-built) 1995 Mazda Carol

K6A
The tiny 660 cc K6A was a Suzuki-designed and -produced inline-three, used in the (Suzuki-built) 1998 Mazda Carol.

See also
 Mazda OHV engine
 Mazda engines

Kei car